Guadalupe School District is a school district in Guadalupe, California, in northwestern Santa Barbara County.  The district is composed of two schools, Mary Buren School (K-5) and Kermit McKenzie Junior High School (6-8) and there are 1157 students enrolled in this school district.

It is bordered on the east by the Santa Maria-Bonita Elementary School District, on the southeast by the Orcutt Union Elementary School District, and on the south by the Casmalia Elementary School District.

See also
 List of school districts in Santa Barbara County, California

References

External links
 

School districts in Santa Barbara County, California